Sporting Clube da Horta is a professional handball team based in Horta, Azores, Portugal. It plays in the Liga Portuguesa de Andebol.

European results

Portuguese handball clubs
Sports teams in the Azores